In the game of bridge mathematical probabilities play a significant role. Different declarer play strategies lead to success depending on the distribution of opponent's cards. To decide which strategy has highest likelihood of success, the declarer needs to have at least an elementary knowledge of probabilities.

The tables below specify the various prior probabilities, i.e. the probabilities in the absence of any further information. During bidding and play, more information about the hands becomes available, allowing players to improve their probability estimates.

Probability of suit distributions (for missing trumps, etc.) in two hidden hands

This table represents the different ways that two to eight particular cards may be distributed, or may lie or split, between two unknown 13-card hands (before the bidding and play, or a priori).

The table also shows the number of combinations of particular cards that match any numerical split and the probabilities for each combination.

These probabilities follow directly from the law of Vacant Places.

Calculation of probabilities 
Let  be the probability of an East player with  unknown cards holding  cards in a given suit and a West player with  unknown cards holding  cards in the given suit. The total number of arrangements of  cards in the suit in  spaces is  i.e. the number of permutations of  objects of which cards in the suit are indistinguishable and cards not in the suit are indistinguishable. Therefore, If the direction of the split is unimportant (it is only required that the split be -, not that East is specifically required to hold  cards), then the overall probability is given bywhere the Kronecker delta ensures that the situation where East and West have the same number of cards in the suit is not counted twice.

The above probabilities assume  and that the direction of the split is unimportant, and so are given byThe more general formula can be used to calculate the probability of a suit breaking if a player is known to have cards in another suit from e.g. the bidding. Suppose East is known to have 7 spades from the bidding and after seeing dummy you deduce West to hold 2 spades; then if your two lines of play are to hope either for diamonds 5-3 or clubs 4-2, the a priori probabilities are 47% and 48% respectively but  and  so now the club line is significantly better than the diamond line.

Probability of HCP distribution

High card points (HCP) are usually counted using the Milton Work scale of 4/3/2/1 points for each Ace/King/Queen/Jack respectively. The a priori probabilities that a given hand contains no more than a specified number of HCP is given in the table below. To find the likelihood of a certain point range, one simply subtracts the two relevant cumulative probabilities. So, the likelihood of being dealt a 12-19 HCP hand (ranges inclusive) is the probability of having at most 19 HCP minus the probability of having at most 11 HCP, or: 0.9855 − 0.6518 = 0.3337.

Hand pattern probabilities
A hand pattern denotes the distribution of the thirteen cards in a hand over the four suits. In total 39 hand patterns are possible, but only 13 of them have an a priori probability exceeding 1%. The most likely pattern is the 4-4-3-2 pattern consisting of two four-card suits, a three-card suit and a doubleton.

Note that the hand pattern leaves unspecified which particular suits contain the indicated lengths. For a 4-4-3-2 pattern, one needs to specify which suit contains the three-card and which suit contains the doubleton in order to identify the length in each of the four suits. There are four possibilities to first identify the three-card suit and three possibilities to next identify the doubleton. Hence, the number of suit permutations of the 4-4-3-2 pattern is twelve. Or, stated differently, in total there are twelve ways a 4-4-3-2 pattern can be mapped onto the four suits.

Below table lists all 39 possible hand patterns, their probability of occurrence, as well as the number of suit permutations for each pattern. The list is ordered according to likelihood of occurrence of the hand patterns.

The 39 hand patterns can by classified into four hand types: balanced hands, single suiters, two suiters and three-suiters. Below table gives the a priori likelihoods of being dealt a certain hand-type.

Alternative grouping of the 39 hand patterns can be made either by longest suit or by shortest suit. Below tables gives the a priori chance of being dealt a hand with a longest or a shortest suit of given length.

Number of possible hands and deals
There are 635,013,559,600 different hands that one player can hold. Furthermore, when the remaining 39 cards are included with all their combinations there are 53,644,737,765,488,792,839,237,440,000 (53.6 x 1027) different deals possible  The immenseness of this number can be understood by answering the question "How large an area would you need to spread all possible bridge deals if each deal would occupy only one square millimeter?". The answer is: an area more than a hundred million times the surface area of Earth.

Obviously, the deals that are identical except for swapping—say—the 2 and the 3 would be unlikely to give a different result. To make the irrelevance of small cards explicit (which is not always the case though), in bridge such small cards are generally denoted by an 'x'. Thus, the "number of possible deals" in this sense depends on how many non-honour cards (2, 3, .. 9) are considered 'indistinguishable'. For example, if 'x' notation is applied to all cards smaller than ten, then the suit distributions A987-K106-Q54-J32 and A432-K105-Q76-J98 would be considered identical.

The table below  gives the number of deals when various numbers of small cards are considered indistinguishable.

Note that the last entry in the table (37,478,624) corresponds to the number of different distributions of the deck (the number of deals when cards are only distinguished by their suit).

Probability of Losing-Trick Counts
The Losing-Trick Count is an alternative to the HCP count as a method of hand evaluation.

References

Further reading
  Second French edition by the authors in 1954. Translated and edited into English by Alec Traub as The Mathematical Theory of Bridge; printed in 1974 in Taiwan through the assistance of C.C. Wei.